Cacteae is a tribe of plants of the family Cactaceae found mainly in North America especially Mexico. , the internal classification of the family Cactaceae remained uncertain and subject to change. A classification incorporating many of the insights from the molecular studies was produced by Nyffeler and Eggli in 2010.

Description
The spherical to short columnar plants grow individually or in cushions. Their size varies from dwarf (Turbinicarpus) to huge (Ferocactus). The  non-segmented shoot axis is ribbed (Echinocactus), warty (Coryphantha) or ribbed-warty. The size and shape of the warts ranges from long and leafy (Leuchtenbergia) to broad with flat axillae (Turbinicarpus). The areoles are usually oval, ribbon-like, grooved, or dimorphic. The small to medium-sized, regular to rarely bilaterally symmetrical flowers appear below the crown and open during the day. The fruits are fleshy to juicy berry-like, with a scaly to glabrous pericarp. They are bursting to non-bursting or simply crumbling. The small to large seeds vary in shape and surface structure of the seed coat.

Genera 
The classification of cacti is in flux; the following list of genera is that from Nyffeler and Eggli (2010).

 Acharagma
 Ariocarpus
 Astrophytum
 Aztekium
Cochemiea has been split off since Nyffeler and Eggli (2010)
 Coryphantha
 Digitostigma 
 Echinocactus 
 Echinomastus
 Epithelantha
 Escobaria
 Ferocactus
 Geohintonia
 Leuchtenbergia
 Lophophora
 Mammillaria – 
 Mammilloydia
 Obregonia
 Pediocactus
 Pelecyphora
 Sclerocactus
 Stenocactus
 Strombocactus
 Thelocactus
 Turbinicarpus – Kadenicarpus and Rapicactus have been split off since Nyffeler and Eggli (2010).

The type genus is Mammillaria.

References 

Cactoideae
Caryophyllales tribes